Hetten FC is a Saudi Arabian professional football club based in Samtah. It was founded in 1976, and first named as Hottain Samtah. Hetten is well known in Saudi Arabia for one of the best youth coaching system and producing many talented players.

Current squad 
As of Saudi Second Division:

References

External links
 

Football clubs in Saudi Arabia
Association football clubs established in 1976
1976 establishments in Saudi Arabia
Football clubs in Samtah